Hot Wheels Unleashed is a 2021 racing game developed and published by Milestone based on Mattel's Hot Wheels toyline. The game was released on September 30, 2021 for the Nintendo Switch, PlayStation 4, PlayStation 5, Windows, Xbox One, and Xbox Series X/S. Versions for Amazon Luna and Stadia were made available in July and September 2022, respectively.

Gameplay
Hot Wheels Unleashed is a racing game played from a third-person perspective. In the game, the player assumes control of vehicles from the Hot Wheels franchise, and races against other opponents in miniature tracks set in various everyday locations and environments, such as a garage, kitchen, and bedroom. The vehicles featured in the game can be extensively customized. 66 different cars were available at launch. The game also features a career mode, a time trial, and a track editor. The game supports up to 12 players in an online session, though players can also compete with another player in a local split-screen multiplayer mode.

Development 
The game was developed by Italian developer Milestone, the company behind the MotoGP games and the Ride series, and marks the first console game based around the property since 2013  Milestone pitched the idea to Mattel in 2018 although they did not expect them to take up the offer. Milestone desired to create such a game after realizing that although they specialized in sim racers that was a "niche of the niche" and the racing genre itself was quite crowded with lead game designer, Federico Cardini telling Polygon "could we make a game to the level of, I don’t know, Gran Turismo? Technically speaking, yes. Should we go head to head with Gran Turismo? That does not sound like a great idea." The game uses a physics system similar from Milestone's other games, heavily modified so that the cars would be able to perform stunts the series is known for. The team wanted to base the gameplay on physics because they felt that many other Arcade racers felt "scripted" with the cars not reacting to the player's action.

According to Cardini, the development team desired to accurately replicate Hot Wheels vehicles to a "1:1 ratio" in the game. Using this method, the team added in many subtle details to the cars and maps. Cardini described the in-game garage as the "inspiration to the entire game", noting its many characteristics.

Marketing and release 
The game was officially announced on February 25, 2021. The game released on September 30, 2021 for Nintendo Switch, PlayStation 4, PlayStation 5, Windows, Xbox One, and Xbox Series X and Series S. Milestone also had plans to support the game extensively with downloadable content upon launch. A version for Amazon Luna was made available on July 21, 2022. On September 29, 2022, a Game of the Year edition containing all of the downloadable content was released for all available platforms alongside Stadia.

Reception

According to review aggregator Metacritic, the PC and PlayStation 5 versions received "generally favorable" reviews, while the Nintendo Switch, PlayStation 4 and Xbox Series X versions received "mixed or average" reviews.

Awards and accolades
Hot Wheels Unleashed was nominated for Best Sports/Racing Game at The Game Awards 2021.

Sales 
Hot Wheels Unleashed was the fourth best selling title in United Kingdom behind FIFA 22, Mario Kart 8 Deluxe and Sonic Colors: Ultimate.
On December 20, 2021, Milestone announced that the game has sold 1 million copies, becoming the fastest-selling title ever for the publisher.

References

External links
 

2021 video games
PlayStation 4 games
PlayStation 5 games
Xbox One games
Xbox Series X and Series S games
Nintendo Switch games
Unreal Engine games
Windows games
Multiplayer and single-player video games
Hot Wheels video games
Racing video games
Video games developed in Italy
Milestone srl games
Video games based on toys